Henry Heylyn Hayter  (28 October 1821 – 23 March 1895) was an English-born Australian statistician

Life
Hayter was the son of Henry Hayter and his wife Eliza Jane née Heylyn, and was born at Eden Vale, Wiltshire, England. He was educated at Charterhouse School and at Paris, and entered the Merchant Navy as a midshipman. He emigrated to Victoria, Australia in December 1852.

After five years in Australia, Hayter joined the Victorian registrar-general's department in 1857 and gave particular attention to the statistics of the colony. In 1862 he was put at the head of the statistical branch of the department. He was appointed secretary to a Royal Commission to inquire into the working of the public service of Victoria in 1870, and in 1872 compiled an exhaustive report, which was the basis of the Public Service Act. Towards the end 1872, he spent a short holiday in New Zealand, where he investigated, at the request of the Government, the working of the Registrar-General's department, and made suggestions for its improvement. All his suggestions were adopted. In May 1874 he was appointed Victorian Government Statist in charge of a separate department and immediately started the "Victorian Year Book". In 1875 a conference of Australian statisticians met at Hobart, to consider setting up uniform methods of handling official statistics. In most cases it was decided to adopt the methods used by Hayter. He edited and wrote most of a "Precis of Information on the Colony of Victoria, and its Capabilities for Defence" for the Intelligence Department of the War Office in 1877.

In 1879 Hayter visited England as secretary to the Graham Berry and Charles Henry Pearson mission to London, and twice gave evidence to a committee of the British House of Commons which was considering how the system of collecting British statistics should be organised. In 1888 Hayter was president of the section dealing with economic and social science and statistics at the first meeting of the Australasian Association for the Advancement of Science, and in his presidential address pointed out the need for the methods in the different colonies to be completely uniform. He had conducted the census in Victoria in 1871 and 1881, and had found that a departure by any one colony from the established practice of the others made it quite impossible to deal with some statistics for the whole of Australia. He had intended retiring in 1890 but at the request of the government conducted the 1891 census. Hayter wrote several works including Notes of a Tour in New Zealand, Notes on the Colony of Victoria, a short history and a geography of Victoria for use in Victorian State schools, and of a Handbook to the Colony of Victoria, as well as a Nosological Index used throughout Australasia for classifying the causes of death. He wrote many papers which were read before scientific societies in various parts of the world and also produced some poetical works. He was created C.M.G. in 1882. Hayter died at Armadale near Melbourne in 1895. He was elected a Fellow of the Royal Geographical Society in 1891.

Hayter married Susan Dodd, daughter of William Dodd, in 1855 and they had a son. Henry's brother Harrison Hayter was a distinguished civil engineer in England.

References

Sources

1821 births
1895 deaths
People from Wiltshire
People educated at Charterhouse School
Australian people of English descent
Australian public servants
Australian statisticians
Companions of the Order of St Michael and St George
Fellows of the Royal Geographical Society